Eretris decorata is a butterfly of the family Nymphalidae. It is found in Colombia.

The larvae feed on various species of bunch grass.

Taxonomy
Some authors treat it as a subspecies of Eretris porphyria.

References

Butterflies described in 1867
Satyrini
Nymphalidae of South America
Taxa named by Baron Cajetan von Felder
Taxa named by Rudolf Felder